Scott Boyd (born 4 June 1986) is a Scottish former professional footballer. In his career, Boyd played for Livingston, Partick Thistle, Ross County and Kilmarnock.

Career
His career started with Livingston, from where he joined Partick Thistle on loan in January of the 2005–06 season. He helped the Jags to win promotion from the Second Division and, after the play-offs, Thistle then purchased his contract from Livingston. At the start of the 2007–08 with Partick Thistle promoted, Boyd had first team place limited and determined to fight for his place.

In September 2007, Boyd signed on loan for Ross County until January 2008. On 14 January 2008, he signed for Ross County on a permanent basis. Despite interests from Aberdeen, Boyd signed a new contract with the club.

In the 2009–10 season, Boyd netted a goal in the last minute to knock Hibs out of the Scottish Cup at the quarter-final Stage. Ross County went on to reach the 2010 Scottish Cup Final, but lost 3–0 to Dundee United. During the 2009–10 season, Boyd would also signed would sign a contract extension. Boyd was part of the Ross County team that gained promotion to the Scottish Premier League by winning the 2011–12 Scottish First Division. At the end of the season, Boyd signed a one-year contract with Ross County. While at Ross County, Boyd is known to fans as "Ginger Pele" because of his resemblance to Pelé.

At the end of the 2012–13 season, Boyd signed a new one-year contract with Ross County after helping them finish fifth in their first season in the Scottish Premier League. During the season, Boyd captained once in the season when he led Ross County win 3–2 against Celtic. On 1 January 2014, Boyd opened the scoring as Ross County won the New Year Highland derby match 2–1 away to Inverness Caledonian Thistle.

On 27 May 2014, he signed a new contract keeping him at Ross County for the 2014–15 season.

On 25 August 2015, Boyd became Ross County's record appearances holder since they joined the Scottish League, making his 288th appearance for the club in their 2–0 win against Ayr United in the Scottish League Cup.

On 31 August 2016, Boyd moved on a season-long loan to Kilmarnock. He then made the move permanent on 31 January 2017, signing until summer 2018. Boyd signed a new contract with Kilmarnock in March 2019, due to run until summer 2020.

He retired from playing in June 2019, returning to former club Ross County as sporting director.

Career statistics

Honours

Ross County
Scottish Challenge Cup: 2010–11
Scottish League Cup: 2015–16

References

External links

 (2007–08 stats)

Living people
1986 births
People from Whitburn, West Lothian
Footballers from West Lothian
Scottish footballers
Scottish Football League players
Livingston F.C. players
Partick Thistle F.C. players
Ross County F.C. players
Kilmarnock F.C. players
Association football defenders
Scottish Premier League players
Scottish Professional Football League players
Ross County F.C. non-playing staff